Jabardasth may refer to:

 Jabardasth (film), a Telugu film directed by B.V. Nandini Reddy
 Jabardasth (TV series), a weekly comedy show on the ETV (Telugu) channel 
 Extra Jabardasth, an extended edition of the weekly comedy show